Northern Tablelands is an electoral district of the Legislative Assembly in the Australian state of New South Wales. It is currently held by Adam Marshall representing the National Party, following a by-election triggered by the resignation of independent member Richard Torbay. The electorate currently includes Uralla Shire, Armidale Regional Council, Glen Innes Severn, Inverell Shire, Gwydir Shire and Moree Plains Shire.

History
Northern Tablelands was originally created in 1920, with the introduction of proportional representation, replacing Armidale, Gough and Tenterfield, and elected three members. It was held by the same three members throughout its first incarnation: inaugural Country Party leader Michael Bruxner, state Minister for Education David Drummond, and Labor MP Alfred McClelland, grandfather of former federal Attorney-General Robert McClelland. In 1927, it was divided into the single-member electorates of Armidale and Tenterfield.  It was recreated in 1981, partly replacing Armidale and Tenterfield.

On its recreation in 1981, the seat was a notional  seat. However, Labor's Bill McCarthy, who had previously been the member for the abolished electorate of Armidale, won the seat in the second "Wranslide." McCarthy was a popular member, and held the seat for Labor as the region trended increasingly conservative. McCarthy had developed serious health problems by the 1984 state election, but was persuaded to recontest to maintain Labor control of the seat; he subsequently died in office in 1987. Labor endorsed McCarthy's widow, Thelma, at the subsequent by-election, but she was narrowly defeated by National candidate Ray Chappell after a heavily-publicised campaign. Chappell was re-elected with little difficulty three times, but in the 1999 election faced a challenge from the popular ex-mayor of Armidale, Richard Torbay, standing as an independent. In a shock result, Torbay won the seat with a comfortable margin—the latest case of NSW country areas rejecting the Nationals in favour of local independents.

Torbay was comfortably reelected in 2003, 2007, and 2011, each time taking well over 60 percent of the two-party vote and easily winning enough primary votes to retain the seat outright. He served as Speaker of the New South Wales Legislative Assembly from 2007 to 2011, during what proved to be the final term of Labor's 16-year run in government. He was the first independent to hold that post since 1917. As a measure of his popularity, he suffered a swing of nearly 11 percent in 2011 amid the massive Coalition wave that swept through NSW, but still retained his seat with a comfortable majority of 19.2 percent.

Torbay was forced out of politics in 2013 amid a corruption investigation. At the ensuing by-election, Adam Marshall easily reclaimed the seat for the Nationals. This was not considered an upset; the Nationals would have won it two years earlier with a majority of 26.1 percent in a "traditional" two-party matchup with Labor. Marshall has held the seat without serious difficulty since, and now sits on a majority of 32.8 percent, the safest in the state.

From 1999, Northern Tablelands covered 30,546 km2, including the uplands of northern New South Wales. It centred on the university city of Armidale; other towns included in the electorate are Inverell, Glen Innes, Tenterfield and Uralla. The northern boundary of the electorate is the Queensland border. At the 2003 election, there were 42,886 enrolled voters.

In 2007, the low level of population growth in the electorate led to Northern Tablelands being expanded, both to the west to take in Warialda and Bingara and to the south to take in Walcha and Nowendoc, increasing its area to 44,674 km2.

The redistribution ahead of the 2015 state election saw Northern Tablelands expanded again to 53,153.76 square kilometres. Added to the district was the entirety of Moree Plains Shire  along with the remainder of the former Armidale Dumaresq Shire, whilst Tenterfield Shire was removed from the district.

While Labor frequently runs dead in northern NSW, Northern Tablelands has become particularly unfriendly territory for Labor even by northern NSW standards. Labor has never come reasonably close to retaking the seat since McCarthy's death, and since the turn of the millennium has been lucky to get more than 20 percent of the two-party vote. It has even been pushed into third place on some occasions.

Members

Election results

References

Northern Tablelands
Northern Tablelands
Electoral District of Northern Tablelands
Northern Tablelands
Electoral District of Northern Tablelands
Northern Tablelands
Electoral District of Northern Tablelands
New England (New South Wales)
Northern Tablelands